This is a list of fungi species belonging to the genus Mycosphaerella. The genus includes at least 10,000 species.

A
Mycosphaerella abutilontidicola
Mycosphaerella acaciae
Mycosphaerella acaciigena
Mycosphaerella acanthopanacis
Mycosphaerella aceris
Mycosphaerella acerna
Mycosphaerella achilleae
Mycosphaerella acicola
Mycosphaerella acilegna
Mycosphaerella aconitorum
Mycosphaerella acori
Mycosphaerella acrocomiicola
Mycosphaerella actaeae
Mycosphaerella actinidiae
Mycosphaerella adenophorae
Mycosphaerella adhatodae
Mycosphaerella adonidina
Mycosphaerella advena
Mycosphaerella aeluropodis
Mycosphaerella aequatoriensis
Mycosphaerella aesculi
Mycosphaerella aethiops
Mycosphaerella afghanica
Mycosphaerella africana
Mycosphaerella agapanthi
Mycosphaerella agapanthi-umbellati
Mycosphaerella agaves
Mycosphaerella aggregata
Mycosphaerella agostinii
Mycosphaerella agrimoniae
Mycosphaerella agrostistachydis
Mycosphaerella ailanthi
Mycosphaerella airicola
Mycosphaerella alarum
Mycosphaerella alba
Mycosphaerella albescens
Mycosphaerella albiziae
Mycosphaerella albocrustata
Mycosphaerella alchemillae
Mycosphaerella alchemillicola
Mycosphaerella aleuritidicola
Mycosphaerella aleuritis
Mycosphaerella algarbiensis
Mycosphaerella algida
Mycosphaerella aliena
Mycosphaerella alismatis
Mycosphaerella allicina
Mycosphaerella allii-cepae
Mycosphaerella alnicola
Mycosphaerella alni-viridis
Mycosphaerella alnobetulae
Mycosphaerella alocasiae
Mycosphaerella aloës
Mycosphaerella alpina
Mycosphaerella alpiniae
Mycosphaerella alpiniicola
Mycosphaerella alsophila
Mycosphaerella altera
Mycosphaerella althaeina
Mycosphaerella alyssi
Mycosphaerella alyxiae
Mycosphaerella ambiens
Mycosphaerella ambigua
Mycosphaerella ambiphyllus
Mycosphaerella amomi
Mycosphaerella anacardiicola
Mycosphaerella andersonii
Mycosphaerella andicola
Mycosphaerella andirae
Mycosphaerella andrewsii
Mycosphaerella andromedae
Mycosphaerella anethi
Mycosphaerella angelicae
Mycosphaerella argentinensis
Mycosphaerella angophorae
Mycosphaerella angulata
Mycosphaerella angustifoliorum
Mycosphaerella annulata
Mycosphaerella antarctica
Mycosphaerella anthemidina
Mycosphaerella anthurii
Mycosphaerella antoniana
Mycosphaerella antonovii
Mycosphaerella aphyuanthis
Mycosphaerella apiahyna
Mycosphaerella apocynica
Mycosphaerella applanata
Mycosphaerella apula
Mycosphaerella aquatica
Mycosphaerella aquilegiae
Mycosphaerella aquilegiae-jonesii
Mycosphaerella aquilina
Mycosphaerella arachidis
Mycosphaerella arachnoidea
Mycosphaerella araliae
Mycosphaerella araucariae
Mycosphaerella arbuticola
Mycosphaerella arbutifoliae
Mycosphaerella arctica
Mycosphaerella ardisiae
Mycosphaerella arenariicola
Mycosphaerella areola
Mycosphaerella aretiae
Mycosphaerella aristolochiae
Mycosphaerella aronici
Mycosphaerella artemisiae
Mycosphaerella artraxonicola
Mycosphaerella artocarpi
Mycosphaerella arundinariae
Mycosphaerella asclepiadis
Mycosphaerella asensioi
Mycosphaerella asiminae
Mycosphaerella asparagi
Mycosphaerella asperifolii
Mycosphaerella asperulata
Mycosphaerella asphodelina
Mycosphaerella aspidii
Mycosphaerella asplenii
Mycosphaerella asterinoides
Mycosphaerella asteroma
Mycosphaerella astragali
Mycosphaerella astragalina
Mycosphaerella asunciensis
Mycosphaerella athamantae
Mycosphaerella atichiae
Mycosphaerella atomus
Mycosphaerella atractyloidis
Mycosphaerella atropae
Mycosphaerella aucubae
Mycosphaerella aucupariae
Mycosphaerella auerswaldii
Mycosphaerella aurantia
Mycosphaerella aurantiorum

B
Mycosphaerella babjaniae
Mycosphaerella baccharidiphila
Mycosphaerella bacillifera
Mycosphaerella badensis
Mycosphaerella bakeri
Mycosphaerella balansae
Mycosphaerella balcanica
Mycosphaerella baldensis
Mycosphaerella balsamopopuli
Mycosphaerella balsamorrhizae
Mycosphaerella bambusae
Mycosphaerella bambusicola
Mycosphaerella bambusifolia
Mycosphaerella bambusina
Mycosphaerella banksiae
Mycosphaerella baptisiicola
Mycosphaerella barnadesiae
Mycosphaerella baudysiana
Mycosphaerella bauhiniae
Mycosphaerella baumaea
Mycosphaerella beaglensis
Mycosphaerella belladonnae
Mycosphaerella bellona
Mycosphaerella bellula
Mycosphaerella benguetensis
Mycosphaerella berberidis
Mycosphaerella berkeleyi
Mycosphaerella berlesiana
Mycosphaerella bhandardarensis
Mycosphaerella biguttulata
Mycosphaerella bixae
Mycosphaerella bolleana
Mycosphaerella bombycina
Mycosphaerella bonae-noctis
Mycosphaerella borealis
Mycosphaerella borreriae
Mycosphaerella botrychii
Mycosphaerella brachycomes
Mycosphaerella bracteophila
Mycosphaerella braheae
Mycosphaerella brassicicola
Mycosphaerella brideliae
Mycosphaerella brionnensis
Mycosphaerella brunnea
Mycosphaerella brunneola
Mycosphaerella brunneomaculans
Mycosphaerella buckinghamiae
Mycosphaerella bulgarica
Mycosphaerella bumeliae
Mycosphaerella buna
Mycosphaerella bupleuri
Mycosphaerella bupleurina
Mycosphaerella burnatii
Mycosphaerella buxicola
Mycosphaerella byliana
Mycosphaerella byrsonimae

C
Mycosphaerella cacaliae
Mycosphaerella calamagrostidis
Mycosphaerella calamagrostis
Mycosphaerella calceoli
Mycosphaerella californica
Mycosphaerella calopogonii
Mycosphaerella calotropidis
Mycosphaerella calycanthi
Mycosphaerella calycicola
Mycosphaerella camarae
Mycosphaerella camelliae
Mycosphaerella camphorosmae
Mycosphaerella campoi
Mycosphaerella canariensis
Mycosphaerella canavaliae
Mycosphaerella canephorae
Mycosphaerella cannabis
Mycosphaerella capparis
Mycosphaerella capreolatae
Mycosphaerella capronii
Mycosphaerella caricae
Mycosphaerella caricis
Mycosphaerella carinthiaca
Mycosphaerella carniolica
Mycosphaerella caroliniana
Mycosphaerella carphae
Mycosphaerella carpogena
Mycosphaerella caryigena
Mycosphaerella caryophyllata
Mycosphaerella caryophylli
Mycosphaerella cassiae
Mycosphaerella cassinopsidis
Mycosphaerella cassiopes
Mycosphaerella castaneicola
Mycosphaerella castanopsidis
Mycosphaerella castillae
Mycosphaerella castilleyae
Mycosphaerella caulicola
Mycosphaerella cecropiae
Mycosphaerella cedrelae
Mycosphaerella celtidis
Mycosphaerella centellae
Mycosphaerella cephalanthae
Mycosphaerella cerasella
Mycosphaerella cerasicola
Mycosphaerella cercidicola
Mycosphaerella cercidis
Mycosphaerella cerei
Mycosphaerella cesatiana
Mycosphaerella chaenomelis
Mycosphaerella chamaemori
Mycosphaerella chamaenerii
Mycosphaerella chamaeropis
Mycosphaerella chardonii
Mycosphaerella chaubattiensis
Mycosphaerella chelidonii
Mycosphaerella chenopodii
Mycosphaerella chenopodiicola
Mycosphaerella chimaphilina
Mycosphaerella chlorina
Mycosphaerella chlorogali
Mycosphaerella chlorinensis
Mycosphaerella chrysanthemi
Mycosphaerella chrysobalani
Mycosphaerella chrysobalanicola
Mycosphaerella ciliata
Mycosphaerella cinnafolia
Mycosphaerella cinnamomicola
Mycosphaerella circe
Mycosphaerella circumdans
Mycosphaerella cirsii
Mycosphaerella cirsii-arvensis
Mycosphaerella citri
Mycosphaerella citricola
Mycosphaerella citrigena
Mycosphaerella cladii
Mycosphaerella clallamensis
Mycosphaerella clematidina
Mycosphaerella cleyerae
Mycosphaerella clidemiae
Mycosphaerella clusiae
Mycosphaerella clymenia
Mycosphaerella coacervata
Mycosphaerella cocoës
Mycosphaerella coerulea
Mycosphaerella coffeae
Mycosphaerella coffeicola
Mycosphaerella coggyriae
Mycosphaerella collina
Mycosphaerella colocasiae
Mycosphaerella colombiensis
Mycosphaerella colorata
Mycosphaerella columbariae
Mycosphaerella columbi
Mycosphaerella columbiae
Mycosphaerella communis
Mycosphaerella confinis
Mycosphaerella confusa
Mycosphaerella conglomerata
Mycosphaerella conglomeratiformis
Mycosphaerella conigena
Mycosphaerella conspicua
Mycosphaerella contraria
Mycosphaerella convallariae
Mycosphaerella convexula
Mycosphaerella coptis
Mycosphaerella cordata
Mycosphaerella cordylinicola
Mycosphaerella corispermi
Mycosphaerella corni
Mycosphaerella cornicola
Mycosphaerella coronillae-variae
Mycosphaerella corylina
Mycosphaerella costii
Mycosphaerella cotoneastri
Mycosphaerella coymiana
Mycosphaerella crataegi
Mycosphaerella crataegicola
Mycosphaerella craterispermi
Mycosphaerella crepidophora
Mycosphaerella crietiana
Mycosphaerella crini
Mycosphaerella cruchetii
Mycosphaerella cruciatae
Mycosphaerella cruciferarum
Mycosphaerella cruenta
Mycosphaerella cryptica
Mycosphaerella crystallinus
Mycosphaerella crystallina
Mycosphaerella cuboniana
Mycosphaerella cunninghamiae
Mycosphaerella cunninghamii
Mycosphaerella cupaniae
Mycosphaerella cuprea
Mycosphaerella curvulata
Mycosphaerella cussoniae
Mycosphaerella cuttsiae
Mycosphaerella cyaneae
Mycosphaerella cydoniae
Mycosphaerella cynodontis
Mycosphaerella cyparissiae
Mycosphaerella cyparissincola
Mycosphaerella cyperi
Mycosphaerella cypripedii

D
Mycosphaerella dacrydii
Mycosphaerella dactylidis
Mycosphaerella dahliae
Mycosphaerella dalbergiae
Mycosphaerella dalmatica
Mycosphaerella danaeae
Mycosphaerella danica
Mycosphaerella danubialis
Mycosphaerella daphnes
Mycosphaerella daphniphylli
Mycosphaerella dauci
Mycosphaerella daviesiae
Mycosphaerella daviesiicola
Mycosphaerella davisii
Mycosphaerella davisoniella
Mycosphaerella dealbans
Mycosphaerella dearnessii
Mycosphaerella decidua
Mycosphaerella degeneri
Mycosphaerella deightonii
Mycosphaerella dejanira
Mycosphaerella delegatensis
Mycosphaerella delphinii
Mycosphaerella delphiniicola
Mycosphaerella dendrobii-nobilis
Mycosphaerella dendroides
Mycosphaerella dendromeconis
Mycosphaerella denigrans
Mycosphaerella dennettiae
Mycosphaerella densa
Mycosphaerella depazeiformis
Mycosphaerella depressa
Mycosphaerella deschampsiae
Mycosphaerella desmazieri
Mycosphaerella desmodii
Mycosphaerella desmodiifolii
Mycosphaerella deutziae
Mycosphaerella devia
Mycosphaerella dianellae
Mycosphaerella dianellincola
Mycosphaerella dianthi
Mycosphaerella dichrostachydis
Mycosphaerella dictamni
Mycosphaerella didymelloides
Mycosphaerella didymopanacis
Mycosphaerella dieffenbachiae
Mycosphaerella digitalis
Mycosphaerella digitalis-ambiguae
Mycosphaerella dioscoreae
Mycosphaerella dioscoreicola
Mycosphaerella diospyri
Mycosphaerella discophora
Mycosphaerella disseminata
Mycosphaerella ditissima
Mycosphaerella dodartiae
Mycosphaerella dodonaeae
Mycosphaerella dolichospora
Mycosphaerella dominicana
Mycosphaerella donacis
Mycosphaerella dracocephali
Mycosphaerella dracocephalicola
Mycosphaerella droserae
Mycosphaerella dryadicola
Mycosphaerella drymariae
Mycosphaerella dubia
Mycosphaerella dummeri
Mycosphaerella dunbariae

E
Mycosphaerella earliana
Mycosphaerella ebuli
Mycosphaerella ebulina
Mycosphaerella ecdysantherae
Mycosphaerella edelbergii
Mycosphaerella effigurata
Mycosphaerella elaeagnicola
Mycosphaerella elaeidis
Mycosphaerella elastica
Mycosphaerella elatior
Mycosphaerella elatostemmatis
Mycosphaerella ellipsoidea
Mycosphaerella elodis
Mycosphaerella elymi
Mycosphaerella embothrii
Mycosphaerella emeri
Mycosphaerella endophytica
Mycosphaerella endospermi
Mycosphaerella engleriana
Mycosphaerella entadae
Mycosphaerella enteleae
Mycosphaerella ephedrae
Mycosphaerella ephedricola
Mycosphaerella epilobii
Mycosphaerella epilobii-montani
Mycosphaerella epimedii
Mycosphaerella epiphylla
Mycosphaerella equiseti
Mycosphaerella equiseticola
Mycosphaerella equisetina
Mycosphaerella eragrostidis
Mycosphaerella erechthitidina
Mycosphaerella ericae-ciliaris
Mycosphaerella eriodendri
Mycosphaerella eriophila
Mycosphaerella eryngii
Mycosphaerella eryngiicola
Mycosphaerella eryngina
Mycosphaerella erysiphoides
Mycosphaerella erythrinae
Mycosphaerella erythrinicola
Mycosphaerella erythroxyli
Mycosphaerella escalloniae
Mycosphaerella eucalypti
Mycosphaerella eucalyptorum
Mycosphaerella eugeniae
Mycosphaerella eugenicola
Mycosphaerella eulaliae
Mycosphaerella eumusae
Mycosphaerella euodiae
Mycosphaerella eupatorii
Mycosphaerella eupatoriicola
Mycosphaerella euphorbiae
Mycosphaerella euphorbiae-canariensis
Mycosphaerella euphorbiae-exiquae
Mycosphaerella euryae
Mycosphaerella eurypotami
Mycosphaerella evernia
Mycosphaerella exaci
Mycosphaerella exarida
Mycosphaerella exigua

F
Mycosphaerella fagi
Mycosphaerella fagraeae
Mycosphaerella falcariae
Mycosphaerella feijoae
Mycosphaerella fendleri
Mycosphaerella fennica
Mycosphaerella ferulae
Mycosphaerella fibrillosa
Mycosphaerella fici-ovatae
Mycosphaerella fici-wightianae
Mycosphaerella ficophila
Mycosphaerella ficus
Mycosphaerella fijiensis
Mycosphaerella filicum
Mycosphaerella filipendulae
Mycosphaerella filipendulae-denudatae
Mycosphaerella firmianae
Mycosphaerella flagellariae
Mycosphaerella flageoletiana
Mycosphaerella flexuosa
Mycosphaerella foeniculi
Mycosphaerella foeniculicola
Mycosphaerella foeniculina
Mycosphaerella fori
Mycosphaerella formosana
Mycosphaerella fragariae
Mycosphaerella frankeniae
Mycosphaerella frauxii
Mycosphaerella fraxini
Mycosphaerella fraxinicola
Mycosphaerella frenumbensis
Mycosphaerella freycinetiae
Mycosphaerella friesii
Mycosphaerella fruticum
Mycosphaerella fuchsiicola
Mycosphaerella fuiiensis
Mycosphaerella fumaginea
Mycosphaerella fusca
Mycosphaerella fushinoki

G
Mycosphaerella galanthina
Mycosphaerella galatellae
Mycosphaerella galegae
Mycosphaerella galii
Mycosphaerella galii-elliptici
Mycosphaerella gallae
Mycosphaerella gamsii
Mycosphaerella garciniae
Mycosphaerella gardeniae
Mycosphaerella garganica
Mycosphaerella gastonis
Mycosphaerella gaubae
Mycosphaerella gaultheriae
Mycosphaerella gaveensis
Mycosphaerella gentianae
Mycosphaerella gibsonii
Mycosphaerella glauca
Mycosphaerella glechomae
Mycosphaerella gleicheniae
Mycosphaerella glochidionis
Mycosphaerella glycosmae
Mycosphaerella glycyrrhizae
Mycosphaerella gneticola
Mycosphaerella gordoniae
Mycosphaerella gossypina
Mycosphaerella gracilis
Mycosphaerella graeca
Mycosphaerella graminicola
Mycosphaerella graminis
Mycosphaerella graminum
Mycosphaerella grandis
Mycosphaerella grandispora
Mycosphaerella greenei
Mycosphaerella gregaria
Mycosphaerella grevilleae
Mycosphaerella grisea
Mycosphaerella groveana
Mycosphaerella grumiformis
Mycosphaerella guadarramica
Mycosphaerella guettardina
Mycosphaerella guineensis
Mycosphaerella guttiferae
Mycosphaerella gypsophila

H
Mycosphaerella halimodendri
Mycosphaerella halophila
Mycosphaerella hambergii
Mycosphaerella handelii
Mycosphaerella haraeana
Mycosphaerella hariotiana
Mycosphaerella harknessii
Mycosphaerella harthensis
Mycosphaerella hawaiiensis
Mycosphaerella hederae-helicis
Mycosphaerella hedericola
Mycosphaerella hedychii
Mycosphaerella heimii
Mycosphaerella heimioides
Mycosphaerella helenae
Mycosphaerella hemerocallidis
Mycosphaerella henningsii
Mycosphaerella hepaticae
Mycosphaerella hepaticarum
Mycosphaerella heracleina
Mycosphaerella hesperidum
Mycosphaerella heucherae
Mycosphaerella heveana
Mycosphaerella heveicola
Mycosphaerella hibisci
Mycosphaerella hieracii
Mycosphaerella hieraciophila
Mycosphaerella hippocastani
Mycosphaerella holci
Mycosphaerella holmii
Mycosphaerella holopteleae
Mycosphaerella holualoana
Mycosphaerella homalanthi
Mycosphaerella honckenyae
Mycosphaerella hondae
Mycosphaerella hondai
Mycosphaerella hordei
Mycosphaerella hordicola
Mycosphaerella horii
Mycosphaerella hosackiae
Mycosphaerella hostae
Mycosphaerella hranicensis
Mycosphaerella huteriana
Mycosphaerella hydrocotyles-asiaticae
Mycosphaerella hyperici
Mycosphaerella hypericina
Mycosphaerella hyphiseda
Mycosphaerella hypochaeridis
Mycosphaerella hypodermellae

I
Mycosphaerella idaeina
Mycosphaerella idesiae
Mycosphaerella ignobilis
Mycosphaerella ikedai
Mycosphaerella ilicella
Mycosphaerella ilicicola
Mycosphaerella ilicis
Mycosphaerella ilicis-canariensis
Mycosphaerella immersa
Mycosphaerella impatientina
Mycosphaerella impatientis
Mycosphaerella imperatae
Mycosphaerella implexae
Mycosphaerella implexicola
Mycosphaerella inaequalis
Mycosphaerella incanescens
Mycosphaerella incomperta
Mycosphaerella inconspicua
Mycosphaerella indica
Mycosphaerella indistincta
Mycosphaerella inflata
Mycosphaerella infuscans
Mycosphaerella insignita
Mycosphaerella insulana
Mycosphaerella intermedia
Mycosphaerella ipiranguensis
Mycosphaerella iridis
Mycosphaerella irregulariramosa
Mycosphaerella isariophora
Mycosphaerella isatidis
Mycosphaerella isoplexidis
Mycosphaerella ixanthi
Mycosphaerella ixodiae
Mycosphaerella ixorae

J
Mycosphaerella jaapiana
Mycosphaerella jaczewskii
Mycosphaerella jaffueli
Mycosphaerella janus
Mycosphaerella japonica
Mycosphaerella jasminicola
Mycosphaerella jasmini-officinalis
Mycosphaerella jenensis
Mycosphaerella joerstadii
Mycosphaerella jonkershoekensis
Mycosphaerella juglandis
Mycosphaerella juncaginearum
Mycosphaerella juncellina
Mycosphaerella juniperi
Mycosphaerella juniperina
Mycosphaerella jutlandica
Mycosphaerella juvenis

K
Mycosphaerella kabocha
Mycosphaerella kaduae
Mycosphaerella kakomensis
Mycosphaerella kandawanica
Mycosphaerella kankeshwarensis
Mycosphaerella karajacensis
Mycosphaerella karakulinii
Mycosphaerella keissleri
Mycosphaerella keniensis
Mycosphaerella kerguelensis
Mycosphaerella khayae
Mycosphaerella kirschsteinii
Mycosphaerella koae
Mycosphaerella kochiae
Mycosphaerella koldingensis
Mycosphaerella konae
Mycosphaerella krigiae

L
Mycosphaerella lachesis
Mycosphaerella lachmannii
Mycosphaerella lactucae
Mycosphaerella lageniformis
Mycosphaerella lagunensis
Mycosphaerella lapathi
Mycosphaerella laricina
Mycosphaerella laricis-leptolepidis
Mycosphaerella larsenii
Mycosphaerella latebrosa
Mycosphaerella lateralis
Mycosphaerella lathyri
Mycosphaerella laureolae
Mycosphaerella lebedevae
Mycosphaerella leguminosarum
Mycosphaerella lenticula
Mycosphaerella lepidospermatis
Mycosphaerella leptoasca
Mycosphaerella leptopleura
Mycosphaerella leptospora
Mycosphaerella lethalis
Mycosphaerella leucophaea
Mycosphaerella leucospermi
Mycosphaerella leucospila
Mycosphaerella leucothoes
Mycosphaerella liabi
Mycosphaerella ligea
Mycosphaerella lignicola
Mycosphaerella ligustri
Mycosphaerella limonis
Mycosphaerella linariae
Mycosphaerella lindaviana
Mycosphaerella lindiana
Mycosphaerella lineolata
Mycosphaerella linhartiana
Mycosphaerella lini
Mycosphaerella linicola
Mycosphaerella lini-perennis
Mycosphaerella linnaeae
Mycosphaerella lippiae
Mycosphaerella liriodendri
Mycosphaerella lithospermi
Mycosphaerella lithraeae
Mycosphaerella liukiuensis
Mycosphaerella lobeliae
Mycosphaerella loefgreni
Mycosphaerella loliacea
Mycosphaerella longibasalis
Mycosphaerella longispora
Mycosphaerella longissima
Mycosphaerella loranthi
Mycosphaerella louisianae
Mycosphaerella ludwigiana
Mycosphaerella ludwigii
Mycosphaerella lumae
Mycosphaerella lupini
Mycosphaerella lupulina
Mycosphaerella luzonensis
Mycosphaerella luzonica
Mycosphaerella lychnidicola
Mycosphaerella lycii
Mycosphaerella lycopodii
Mycosphaerella lycopodii-annotini
Mycosphaerella lycopodiicola
Mycosphaerella lygei
Mycosphaerella lysimachiicola
Mycosphaerella lythracearum
Mycosphaerella lythri

M
Mycosphaerella macedonica
Mycosphaerella machaerii
Mycosphaerella macleyae
Mycosphaerella maclurae
Mycosphaerella macrospora
Mycosphaerella maculans
Mycosphaerella maculicola
Mycosphaerella madeirae
Mycosphaerella maderensis
Mycosphaerella maesae
Mycosphaerella magellanica
Mycosphaerella magellanicola
Mycosphaerella magnoliae
Mycosphaerella magnusiana
Mycosphaerella major
Mycosphaerella malinverniana
Mycosphaerella malvina
Mycosphaerella mandshurica
Mycosphaerella manganottiana
Mycosphaerella mangiferae
Mycosphaerella manginii
Mycosphaerella manihotis
Mycosphaerella maniuana
Mycosphaerella mappiae
Mycosphaerella marasasii
Mycosphaerella marksii
Mycosphaerella martagonis
Mycosphaerella martinae
Mycosphaerella maturna
Mycosphaerella mauica
Mycosphaerella maxima
Mycosphaerella maydina
Mycosphaerella mazzantioides
Mycosphaerella medicaginicola
Mycosphaerella medicaginis
Mycosphaerella mediterranea
Mycosphaerella melaleucoides
Mycosphaerella melanophora
Mycosphaerella melanorhabdos
Mycosphaerella melastomatacearum
Mycosphaerella melconiana
Mycosphaerella meliosmae
Mycosphaerella melothriae
Mycosphaerella merrillii
Mycosphaerella metrosideri
Mycosphaerella mexicana
Mycosphaerella miconiae
Mycosphaerella microscopia
Mycosphaerella microsora
Mycosphaerella midzurensis
Mycosphaerella mikaniae
Mycosphaerella mikaniae-micranthae
Mycosphaerella millepunctata
Mycosphaerella milleri
Mycosphaerella mimosae-pigrae
Mycosphaerella mimosicola
Mycosphaerella minabensis
Mycosphaerella minima
Mycosphaerella minimipuncta
Mycosphaerella minoensis
Mycosphaerella minor
Mycosphaerella minuartiae
Mycosphaerella minutissima
Mycosphaerella molluginis
Mycosphaerella mombin
Mycosphaerella monserratica
Mycosphaerella montana
Mycosphaerella montellica
Mycosphaerella moquileae
Mycosphaerella moravica
Mycosphaerella mori
Mycosphaerella mori-albae
Mycosphaerella moricola
Mycosphaerella morierei
Mycosphaerella morindae
Mycosphaerella morphaea
Mycosphaerella morthieri
Mycosphaerella mougeotiana
Mycosphaerella moutan
Mycosphaerella mucosa
Mycosphaerella mucunae
Mycosphaerella muehlenbergiae
Mycosphaerella muelleriana
Mycosphaerella mulgedii-alpini
Mycosphaerella multiloculata
Mycosphaerella multiseptata
Mycosphaerella munkii
Mycosphaerella munyangica
Mycosphaerella murashkii
Mycosphaerella murrayae
Mycosphaerella musae
Mycosphaerella muscari
Mycosphaerella musicola
Mycosphaerella mycoparasitica
Mycosphaerella mycopron
Mycosphaerella myricae
Mycosphaerella myrticola
Mycosphaerella myrtillina

N
Mycosphaerella najas
Mycosphaerella nawae
Mycosphaerella nectandrae
Mycosphaerella nemesiae
Mycosphaerella nemorosa
Mycosphaerella nemoseridis
Mycosphaerella nerii-odori
Mycosphaerella nevodovskii
Mycosphaerella nicotianae
Mycosphaerella niesslii
Mycosphaerella nigerristigma
Mycosphaerella nigrificata
Mycosphaerella nigrita
Mycosphaerella nigromaculans
Mycosphaerella nivalis
Mycosphaerella nogalesii
Mycosphaerella nothofagi
Mycosphaerella nubilosa
Mycosphaerella nuristanica
Mycosphaerella nyssicola

O
Mycosphaerella oblivia
Mycosphaerella occulta
Mycosphaerella octopetalae
Mycosphaerella oculata
Mycosphaerella oedema
Mycosphaerella oerteliana
Mycosphaerella ohnowa
Mycosphaerella oleandri
Mycosphaerella oleina
Mycosphaerella olindensis
Mycosphaerella omphalosporoides
Mycosphaerella onobrychidis
Mycosphaerella ontariensis
Mycosphaerella ootheca
Mycosphaerella operculata
Mycosphaerella opuntiae
Mycosphaerella orbicularis
Mycosphaerella orchidearum
Mycosphaerella ornithogali
Mycosphaerella orobi
Mycosphaerella osborniae
Mycosphaerella osmundicola
Mycosphaerella oxalidis
Mycosphaerella oxyacanthae
Mycosphaerella oxycocci
Mycosphaerella oxyriae

P
Mycosphaerella pachyasca
Mycosphaerella pachysandrae
Mycosphaerella pachystimae
Mycosphaerella pachythecia
Mycosphaerella padina
Mycosphaerella paepalanthi
Mycosphaerella paleicola
Mycosphaerella pales
Mycosphaerella palmae
Mycosphaerella palmicola
Mycosphaerella panacis
Mycosphaerella panacis-ginseng
Mycosphaerella pandani
Mycosphaerella panicicola
Mycosphaerella papuana
Mycosphaerella papyrifera
Mycosphaerella pardalota
Mycosphaerella parjumanica
Mycosphaerella parkii
Mycosphaerella parnassiae
Mycosphaerella paronychiae
Mycosphaerella parva
Mycosphaerella pascuorum
Mycosphaerella pashkiensis
Mycosphaerella passiflorae
Mycosphaerella pataguae
Mycosphaerella patoillardii
Mycosphaerella patriniae
Mycosphaerella paulowniae
Mycosphaerella paulula
Mycosphaerella pavonina
Mycosphaerella peckii
Mycosphaerella pectinis
Mycosphaerella pedicularis
Mycosphaerella pellucida
Mycosphaerella pentastemonis
Mycosphaerella perconferta
Mycosphaerella peregrina
Mycosphaerella perexigua
Mycosphaerella pericampyli
Mycosphaerella pericopsidis
Mycosphaerella periplocae
Mycosphaerella pernettyae
Mycosphaerella perparva
Mycosphaerella perpendicularis
Mycosphaerella perseae
Mycosphaerella persica
Mycosphaerella persooniae
Mycosphaerella peruviana
Mycosphaerella petchii
Mycosphaerella petrakii
Mycosphaerella phacae-frigidae
Mycosphaerella phaceliiphila
Mycosphaerella phalaridis
Mycosphaerella phaseoli
Mycosphaerella phaseolorum
Mycosphaerella pheidasca
Mycosphaerella philochorta
Mycosphaerella philodendri
Mycosphaerella phlomidicola
Mycosphaerella phlomidis
Mycosphaerella phragmitis
Mycosphaerella phyllachoroides
Mycosphaerella phyllanthi
Mycosphaerella phyllitis
Mycosphaerella phyllostachydicola
Mycosphaerella phyllostachydis
Mycosphaerella physostegiae
Mycosphaerella piliostigmatis
Mycosphaerella pimpinellae
Mycosphaerella pini
Mycosphaerella pinicola
Mycosphaerella pinifolia
Mycosphaerella pini-patulae
Mycosphaerella pinodes
Mycosphaerella pinsapo
Mycosphaerella piperis
Mycosphaerella pirolae
Mycosphaerella pirolina
Mycosphaerella pistaciae
Mycosphaerella pistaciarum
Mycosphaerella pistacina
Mycosphaerella pithecellobiicola
Mycosphaerella pittieri
Mycosphaerella pittospori
Mycosphaerella plantaginicola
Mycosphaerella plantaginis
Mycosphaerella plantanifolia
Mycosphaerella platani
Mycosphaerella platanifolia
Mycosphaerella platylobii
Mycosphaerella platytheca
Mycosphaerella plectranthi
Mycosphaerella pluritubularis
Mycosphaerella pneumatophorae
Mycosphaerella podograriae
Mycosphaerella podocarpicola
Mycosphaerella podperae
Mycosphaerella pogostemonis
Mycosphaerella polemonii
Mycosphaerella polia
Mycosphaerella polifoliae
Mycosphaerella polycarpa
Mycosphaerella polygalina
Mycosphaerella polygoni-cuspidati
Mycosphaerella polygonorum
Mycosphaerella polymorpha
Mycosphaerella polyspora
Mycosphaerella pomi
Mycosphaerella pongamieae
Mycosphaerella pontederiae
Mycosphaerella poonensis
Mycosphaerella populi
Mycosphaerella populi-albae
Mycosphaerella populicola
Mycosphaerella populifolia
Mycosphaerella populnea
Mycosphaerella populorum
Mycosphaerella poraqueibae
Mycosphaerella potentillae
Mycosphaerella potentillae-stipularis
Mycosphaerella pourthiaeae
Mycosphaerella pouzolziae
Mycosphaerella praecox
Mycosphaerella praeparva
Mycosphaerella prasii
Mycosphaerella prenanthis
Mycosphaerella primulae
Mycosphaerella prinsepiae
Mycosphaerella proteae
Mycosphaerella proteae-arboreae
Mycosphaerella pruni-persicae
Mycosphaerella psammae
Mycosphaerella pseudacaciae
Mycosphaerella pseudafricana
Mycosphaerella pseudocryptica
Mycosphaerella pseudoendophytica
Mycosphaerella pseudomaculiformis
Mycosphaerella pseudopsammae
Mycosphaerella pseudoseptorioides
Mycosphaerella pseudosphaerioides
Mycosphaerella pseudosuberosa
Mycosphaerella pseudovespa
Mycosphaerella psilospora
Mycosphaerella ptarmicae
Mycosphaerella pteridicola
Mycosphaerella pteridis
Mycosphaerella pterocarpi
Mycosphaerella pterophila
Mycosphaerella puerariae
Mycosphaerella pueraricola
Mycosphaerella pulchella
Mycosphaerella pulmonariae
Mycosphaerella pulsatillae
Mycosphaerella pulviscula
Mycosphaerella punctata
Mycosphaerella punctiformis
Mycosphaerella pusilla
Mycosphaerella putoriae
Mycosphaerella puttemansii
Mycosphaerella pyrenaica
Mycosphaerella pyri
Mycosphaerella pyrina

Q
Mycosphaerella quadrangulata
Mycosphaerella quasicercospora
Mycosphaerella queenslandica
Mycosphaerella quercifolia

R
Mycosphaerella rabiei 
Mycosphaerella radiata 
Mycosphaerella ramulorum 
Mycosphaerella ranunculi 
Mycosphaerella rauwolfiae 
Mycosphaerella ravenelii 
Mycosphaerella readeriellophora 
Mycosphaerella recutita 
Mycosphaerella rehmiana 
Mycosphaerella resedicola 
Mycosphaerella reyesi 
Mycosphaerella rhaphithamni 
Mycosphaerella rhea 
Mycosphaerella rhododendri 
Mycosphaerella rhodophila 
Mycosphaerella rhodostacheos 
Mycosphaerella rhoina 
Mycosphaerella rhois 
Mycosphaerella rhynchosporae 
Mycosphaerella ribis 
Mycosphaerella ricciae 
Mycosphaerella richeae 
Mycosphaerella ricinicola 
Mycosphaerella robiniae 
Mycosphaerella rosae 
Mycosphaerella rosicola 
Mycosphaerella rosigena 
Mycosphaerella rottboelliae 
Mycosphaerella roureae 
Mycosphaerella rubefaciens 
Mycosphaerella rubella 
Mycosphaerella rubi 
Mycosphaerella rubiae 
Mycosphaerella rubicola 
Mycosphaerella rusci 
Mycosphaerella ruscicola 
Mycosphaerella ruthenica

S
Mycosphaerella sabalis
Mycosphaerella saccardoana
Mycosphaerella sacchari
Mycosphaerella saccharoides
Mycosphaerella sagedioides
Mycosphaerella saginae
Mycosphaerella sagittariae
Mycosphaerella sajanyca
Mycosphaerella salciorniae
Mycosphaerella salicicola
Mycosphaerella salicina
Mycosphaerella salicis
Mycosphaerella salicorniae
Mycosphaerella salvatorensis
Mycosphaerella salviae
Mycosphaerella samaneae
Mycosphaerella sanguisorbae
Mycosphaerella sapindicola
Mycosphaerella sarothamni
Mycosphaerella sarraceniae
Mycosphaerella sarracenica
Mycosphaerella sassafras
Mycosphaerella saussureae-alpinae
Mycosphaerella sawadae
Mycosphaerella saxatilis
Mycosphaerella saxifragae
Mycosphaerella scabiosae
Mycosphaerella scaevolae
Mycosphaerella schelkovnikovii
Mycosphaerella schizandrae
Mycosphaerella schoenocauli
Mycosphaerella scirpi-lacustris
Mycosphaerella scirrhoides
Mycosphaerella scopulorum
Mycosphaerella scorzonerae
Mycosphaerella scrophulariae
Mycosphaerella scytalidii
Mycosphaerella secundaria
Mycosphaerella securinegae
Mycosphaerella sedicola
Mycosphaerella selene
Mycosphaerella semeles
Mycosphaerella senecionis
Mycosphaerella septorioides
Mycosphaerella septoriospora
Mycosphaerella septorispora
Mycosphaerella sequoiae
Mycosphaerella serpylli
Mycosphaerella serrulatae
Mycosphaerella sesami
Mycosphaerella sesamicola
Mycosphaerella seseli
Mycosphaerella setosa
Mycosphaerella shawii
Mycosphaerella shibataeae
Mycosphaerella shikaeana
Mycosphaerella shimadae
Mycosphaerella shiraiana
Mycosphaerella shoreae
Mycosphaerella sicula
Mycosphaerella sicyicola
Mycosphaerella sidicola
Mycosphaerella sieberiana
Mycosphaerella silenes-acaulis
Mycosphaerella silenicola
Mycosphaerella silenis
Mycosphaerella silvatica
Mycosphaerella silveirae
Mycosphaerella singularis
Mycosphaerella sisyrinchiicola
Mycosphaerella skimmiae
Mycosphaerella slaptoniensis
Mycosphaerella smilacicola
Mycosphaerella smilacifolii
Mycosphaerella smilacina
Mycosphaerella smilacis-glabrae
Mycosphaerella sodiroana
Mycosphaerella sophorae
Mycosphaerella sordidula
Mycosphaerella spartinae
Mycosphaerella spegazzinii
Mycosphaerella spetsbergensis
Mycosphaerella sphaerelloides
Mycosphaerella sphaerellula
Mycosphaerella sphaerosperma
Mycosphaerella sphaerulinae
Mycosphaerella spilota
Mycosphaerella spinicola
Mycosphaerella spiraeae
Mycosphaerella spissa
Mycosphaerella spleniata
Mycosphaerella spraguei
Mycosphaerella staphyleae
Mycosphaerella staphylina
Mycosphaerella staticicola
Mycosphaerella stellarinearum
Mycosphaerella stemmatea
Mycosphaerella stephaniae
Mycosphaerella stephaniicola
Mycosphaerella stephanorossiae
Mycosphaerella stevensii
Mycosphaerella stigmina-platani
Mycosphaerella stigmophylli
Mycosphaerella stipicola
Mycosphaerella stipina
Mycosphaerella stramenti
Mycosphaerella stramenticola
Mycosphaerella striatiformans
Mycosphaerella stromatica
Mycosphaerella stromatoidea
Mycosphaerella stromatosa
Mycosphaerella strychnotis
Mycosphaerella styracis
Mycosphaerella suaedae-australis
Mycosphaerella subantarctica
Mycosphaerella subastoma
Mycosphaerella subcongregata
Mycosphaerella uberosa
Mycosphaerella subgregaria
Mycosphaerella sublibera
Mycosphaerella subostiolica
Mycosphaerella subsequens
Mycosphaerella succedanea
Mycosphaerella sumacis
Mycosphaerella sumatrensis
Mycosphaerella superflua
Mycosphaerella suttonii
Mycosphaerella swartii
Mycosphaerella sydowii
Mycosphaerella symphyostemonis
Mycosphaerella syncarpiae
Mycosphaerella syringae
Mycosphaerella syringicola
Mycosphaerella syzygii

T
Mycosphaerella tabaci
Mycosphaerella tabebuiae
Mycosphaerella tabifica
Mycosphaerella tabularis
Mycosphaerella taediosa
Mycosphaerella taeniographa
Mycosphaerella taeniographoides
Mycosphaerella tahitensis
Mycosphaerella tajmyrensis
Mycosphaerella tamaricis
Mycosphaerella tamarindi
Mycosphaerella taraxaci
Mycosphaerella tardiva
Mycosphaerella tasmaniensis
Mycosphaerella tassiana
Mycosphaerella tatarica
Mycosphaerella tecomae
Mycosphaerella telopeae
Mycosphaerella ternstroemiae
Mycosphaerella tetraspora
Mycosphaerella tetroncii
Mycosphaerella teucrii
Mycosphaerella thailandica
Mycosphaerella thais
Mycosphaerella thalictri
Mycosphaerella thalictrina
Mycosphaerella thaspiicola
Mycosphaerella theae
Mycosphaerella theissenii
Mycosphaerella thelypteridis
Mycosphaerella theobromae
Mycosphaerella theodulina
Mycosphaerella thermopsidis
Mycosphaerella thesii
Mycosphaerella thironi
Mycosphaerella thujae
Mycosphaerella thujopsidis
Mycosphaerella thysselini
Mycosphaerella tilakii
Mycosphaerella tiliae
Mycosphaerella tingens
Mycosphaerella tinosporae
Mycosphaerella tirolensis
Mycosphaerella tithymali
Mycosphaerella tocoyenae
Mycosphaerella togashiana
Mycosphaerella togniniana
Mycosphaerella toledana
Mycosphaerella tomilinii
Mycosphaerella topographica
Mycosphaerella tormentillae
Mycosphaerella tournefortiae
Mycosphaerella tragopogonicola
Mycosphaerella tremulicola
Mycosphaerella trichomanis
Mycosphaerella trifolii
Mycosphaerella triseti
Mycosphaerella tristaniae
Mycosphaerella trochicarpi
Mycosphaerella tsugae
Mycosphaerella tuerckheimii
Mycosphaerella tulipifera
Mycosphaerella tumulosa
Mycosphaerella tunguahuana
Mycosphaerella tupae
Mycosphaerella tussilaginis
Mycosphaerella typhae
Mycosphaerella typhina

U
Mycosphaerella ulmariae
Mycosphaerella ulmi
Mycosphaerella ulmifolia
Mycosphaerella unedinis
Mycosphaerella urticae-dioicae
Mycosphaerella ushuwaiensis
Mycosphaerella uspenskajae
Mycosphaerella usteriana

V
Mycosphaerella vaccinii
Mycosphaerella vacciniicola
Mycosphaerella vagans
Mycosphaerella valeppensis
Mycosphaerella valida
Mycosphaerella variabilis
Mycosphaerella venezuelensis
Mycosphaerella veratri
Mycosphaerella veratri-lobeliani
Mycosphaerella verbascicola
Mycosphaerella verbenae
Mycosphaerella verecunda
Mycosphaerella vernoniae
Mycosphaerella verrucosiafricana
Mycosphaerella vesicaria
Mycosphaerella vesicaria-arcticae
Mycosphaerella vespa
Mycosphaerella vexans
Mycosphaerella viburni
Mycosphaerella viciae
Mycosphaerella viciarum
Mycosphaerella viegasii
Mycosphaerella vindobonensis
Mycosphaerella violae
Mycosphaerella vitalbina
Mycosphaerella vitensis
Mycosphaerella viticis
Mycosphaerella viticola
Mycosphaerella vitis
Mycosphaerella vitis-viniferae
Mycosphaerella vivipari
Mycosphaerella vogelii
Mycosphaerella vogesiaca
Mycosphaerella volkartii
Mycosphaerella vulnerariae

W
Mycosphaerella wagnerae
Mycosphaerella waimeana
Mycosphaerella wakkeri
Mycosphaerella walkeri
Mycosphaerella washingtoniae
Mycosphaerella websteri
Mycosphaerella weigeliae
Mycosphaerella welwitschii
Mycosphaerella wichuriana
Mycosphaerella winteri
Mycosphaerella winteriana
Mycosphaerella wisteriae
Mycosphaerella wladiwostokensis
Mycosphaerella wollemiae
Mycosphaerella woronichinii
Mycosphaerella woronowii

X
Mycosphaerella xanthiicola
Mycosphaerella xerophylli
Mycosphaerella xylomeli

Y
Mycosphaerella yaku-insularia
Mycosphaerella yanagawaensis
Mycosphaerella yuccae
Mycosphaerella yuccina

Z
Mycosphaerella zeae
Mycosphaerella zeae-maydis
Mycosphaerella zeicola
Mycosphaerella zeina
Mycosphaerella zelkowae
Mycosphaerella zeylanica
Mycosphaerella zilingii
Mycosphaerella zingiberis
Mycosphaerella zizaniae
Mycosphaerella zizaniicola
Mycosphaerella zizyphicola

References
 Öfversigt af Konglelige Vetenskaps-Akademiens Förhandlingar 41(9): 163

Lists of fungal species
 List of species